Below are lists of films produced in Egypt in the 1970s.

List of Egyptian films of 1970
List of Egyptian films of 1971
List of Egyptian films of 1972
List of Egyptian films of 1973
List of Egyptian films of 1974
List of Egyptian films of 1975
List of Egyptian films of 1976
List of Egyptian films of 1977
List of Egyptian films of 1978
List of Egyptian films of 1979

External links
 Egyptian films at the Internet Movie Database

1970s
Egypt